District 33 of the Texas Senate is an obsolete Senate District. Prior to the 1876 Texas Constitution there had been as many as 33 Senate Districts. District 33 was only active from the Fifth Texas Legislature through the Eleventh Texas Legislature.

District officeholders

33